The Nokia 5.1 is a Nokia-branded mid-range smartphone running the Android operating system. It was released in 2018 and is the successor of the Nokia 5.

Design 
The Nokia 5.1 features a 5.5 inch IPS LCD display, a 2 GHz MediaTek Helio P18 chipset paired with either 2 or 3 GB of RAM and a 16 MP primary camera along with a wide-angle 8 MP front camera.
The device was initially shipped with Android Oreo, but can be updated to Android 10.

Reception 
The Nokia 5.1 generally received positive reviews. Basil Kronfli of TechRadar and TrustedReviews praised the device for its design and screen, while criticizing the "Occasionally laggy UI, Mediocre camera performance and Bottom-firing mono speaker".

References

External links
 

5.1
Mobile phones introduced in 2018
Discontinued smartphones